Charles Danforth (August 1, 1815 – March 30, 1890), of Gardiner, Maine, was a justice of the Maine Supreme Judicial Court from January 5, 1864, to March 30, 1890.

Born in Norridgewock, Maine, Danforth read law to be admitted to the bar in 1838. He settled in Gardiner in 1841, from which he was a member of the Executive Council 1855. He was appointed as an associate justice on January 5, 1864, and served until his death.

References

Justices of the Maine Supreme Judicial Court
1815 births
1890 deaths
U.S. state supreme court judges admitted to the practice of law by reading law
People from Norridgewock, Maine
People from Gardiner, Maine
19th-century American judges